Ipsa is a genus of small or medium-sized sea snails, cowries, marine gastropod mollusks in the family Cypraeidae, the cowries.

Species
Species within the genus Ipsa include:
Ipsa childreni (Gray, 1825)

References

Cypraeidae
Monotypic gastropod genera